United House Developments is a property development and housebuilding company based in Southampton Street, London. It is active in the construction of social housing, urban regeneration, refurbishment and Public Private Partnerships (PPP).

History
The origin of the company lies with Geoffrey Granter who founded Harp Heating in 1964. Initially, the core business was installing central heating in council housing while the tenants remained in occupation. Harp Heating broadened this service into an internal refurbishment product for the GLC operating from its 100,000 sq ft warehouse adjacent to the head office at Swanley.Michael Rayfield was joint MD and shareholder until his death in 1984.

After Jeffrey Adams joined the company in 1982, becoming its joint owner with Granter, the company changed its name and expanded into housebuilding and housing refurbishment. In the 1990s, the company won business under the Private Finance Initiative linked to the Decent Homes Programme, and building of new social under the Labour government. A development division named Modern City Living was established in 1990. United House became a PFI housing contractor in the UK, managing some 7,000 homes. In 2008, Modern City Living was rebranded United House Developments.

Granter retired from the business in 2008 and Steven Halbert joined the board as Chairman. Lloyds Development Capital (LDC) invested a minority stake and RBS provided bank loans to fund further expansion in inner city private housebuilding.  

On 16 September 2014, a restructuring of United House Group was announced. United House's construction business (United House Ltd) merged with Bullock Construction, which was also owned by LDC and has a similar profile to United House, but worked in other areas of the UK. The new construction company was called United Living Group, and Bullock's CEO Ian Burnett become the Group Chief Executive. Later in 2014, United House Developments, headed by Adams as chairman and Rick de Blaby as CEO, became a separate development company, based in London.

Awards
The company has won many awards including:
 Daily Mail British Homes Awards 2009 Apartment Building of the Year for Queensbridge Quarter in London Fields, Hackney
 2010 Development of the Year for Arundel Square, Islington
 Daily Telegraph British Homes Awards 2011 for the housing project at Clapham One

Notable projects
The company carried out the conversion of Frobisher Crescent at the Barbican, the original location of the Cass Business School, into residential use. It was also involved in the Central St Giles mixed-use development in Covent Garden.

United House constructed the Clapham One development in Clapham High Street for Cathedral Group in 2012 in a PPP with the London Borough of Lambeth.

In 2013, it completed a project, involving 388 social homes plus office and retail space, in a mixed-use development at Hale Village in Tottenham. 
Around the end of 2013, the company completed the Paynes & Borthwick riverside development at West Greenwich.

References

External links

Real estate companies established in 1964
Housebuilding companies of the United Kingdom
Companies based in Kent
Privately held companies of the United Kingdom